is a former Japanese rugby union player who played as a flanker. He was named in the Japan squad for the 2007 Rugby World Cup, making two appearances in the tournament. He made a further nine appearances for Japan in his career, scoring seven tries.

References

External links
itsrugby.co.uk profile

1980 births
Living people
Japanese rugby union players
Rugby union flankers